NGC 309 is a spiral galaxy in the constellation Cetus. It was discovered in 1876 by Wilhelm Tempel.

References

External links
 

0309
-02-03-050
003377
?
Cetus (constellation)
Intermediate spiral galaxies